Mike Phair (born November 8, 1969) is the defensive line coach for the Ottawa Redblacks of the Canadian Football League (CFL). He previously served as an assistant coach for the Seattle Seahawks, Chicago Bears, Tampa Bay Buccaneers, Indianapolis Colts, and Carolina Panthers.

Coaching career

Arizona State
In 1999, Phair began his coaching career as a graduate assistant and defensive line coach at Arizona State.

Tiffin University
In 2001, Phair was hired as a linebackers coach and special teams coach at Tiffin University.

Seattle Seahawks
After three years as a scout with the organization, in 2008, Phair was hired by the Seattle Seahawks as an assistant linebackers coach. In 2009, he was promoted to assistant defensive line coach. In 2010, he served as a defensive assistant.

Chicago Bears
In 2011, Phair was hired by the Chicago Bears as their defensive line coach.

Tampa Bay Buccaneers
In 2014, Phair was hired by the Tampa Bay Buccaneers as an assistant defensive line coach.

Illinois
In 2015, Phair was hired as a co-defensive coordinator and defensive line coach at Illinois. In 2016, he moved to run game coordinator and defensive line coach.

Indianapolis Colts
On January 26, 2018, Phair was hired by the Indianapolis Colts as their defensive line coach under head coach Frank Reich.

Carolina Panthers
On January 13, 2020, Phair was hired by the Carolina Panthers as their defensive line coach under head coach Matt Rhule.

Ottawa Redblacks
On April 25, 2022, it was announced that Phair had been hired by the Ottawa Redblacks as their defensive line coach under head coach Paul LaPolice.

References

1969 births
Living people
American football linebackers
Arizona State Sun Devils football players
Arizona State Sun Devils football coaches
Tiffin Dragons football coaches
Illinois Fighting Illini football coaches
Seattle Seahawks coaches
Chicago Bears coaches
Tampa Bay Buccaneers coaches
Indianapolis Colts coaches
Carolina Panthers coaches
Ottawa Redblacks coaches